Sir John Mark Somers Hunter (1865 – 20 September 1932) was a schoolmaster in India and the author of school textbooks of English literature. He was the  director of Coimbatore College and professor of Presidency College, Madras; then professor at Government College, Yangon (Rangoon) (1918–1920) and chairman of the commission to establish a university and director of public instruction of Burma under British rule. On 12 July 1920, he put forward the law for this purpose in the governing council. The law being enacted, Rangoon University was established in December and Hunter was made a professor of the university. About 1930, he became a fellow of the Indian Empire Society.

Works
 Politics and Character in Shakespeare's "Julius Caesar" (1931)
 Spelling Reform: warranted by history

School books
 carl's Hero as Man of Letters
 carls's Hero as Divinity
 (with Cecil M. Barrow) De Quincey's Revolt of the Tartars and The English Mail-Coach
 De quaint's Opium Eater

References

Bibliography
 Aye Kyaw, The Voice of Young Burma (Singapore: Institute of Southeast Asian Studies, 1993) pp. 17–18, 31.

1865 births
1932 deaths
British civil servants
British people in colonial India
Indian schoolteachers
Academic staff of the University of Yangon
Academic staff of Presidency College, Chennai